Granville Roland Fortescue (October 12, 1875 – April 21, 1952) was an American soldier, a Rough Rider serving with his cousin, Colonel Theodore Roosevelt in Cuba, a presidential aide in the first Roosevelt administration and later, a journalist and war correspondent for the London Standard during the Rif War in 1920 Spanish Morocco. He wrote for the London Daily Telegraph during World War I and during the Spanish Civil War.

Early life and education
Fortescue was the son of U.S. Congressman Robert Roosevelt (1829–1906), and Marion Theresa "Minnie" O'Shea Fortescue, his mistress.  At the time of his birth, his father was still married to his first wife, Elizabeth Ellis. After Ellis' death, Robert married Minnie. His father then adopted the three children that he had conceived with Minnie before their marriage, Granville, Kenyon, and Maud, and they were known as his stepchildren, although they were his biological children.  At the time of their birth, their father had been listed as "Robert Francis Fortescue," and all maintained the Fortescue name throughout their lives, even though they were born to Robert Roosevelt.

His father, Robert Roosevelt, was the brother of Theodore Roosevelt, Sr., the uncle of President Theodore Roosevelt and the great-uncle of Eleanor Roosevelt.

Fortescue's undergraduate education began at Yale College; then he transferred to the University of Pennsylvania.  His college years were cut short when he volunteered in 1898 for the 1st United States Volunteer Cavalry.  He completed his education when he graduated from the Army Staff College in 1904.

Career
Fortescue was a Rough Rider wounded at San Juan Hill in Cuba and serving in the Philippines during the Spanish–American War.

Fortescue was posted as a U.S. military attaché in Japan during the Russo-Japanese War.  Along with other Western military attachés, he had two complementary missions—to assist the Japanese and to observe the Japanese forces in the field during the Russo-Japanese War.  Service as an artillery officer during World War I was the capstone of Fortescue's military career.

Military honors
 Purple Heart, wounded in foot at San Juan Hill, Cuba, July 1898; wounded at Montfaucon d'Argonne in the Meuse-Argonne Offensive, September 1918.
 Distinguished Service Cross.
 World War I Victory Medal
 Spanish Campaign Medal
 Philippine Insurrection War Medal
 Order of the Rising Sun, Japan.
 Russo-Japanese War Medal, Japan.

Personal life
In 1910, Captain "Rolly" Fortescue married Grace Hubbard Fortescue (née Grace Hubbard Bell) (1883–1979), a niece of the inventor Alexander Graham Bell and an heir to the Bell Telephone Company fortune.  The wedding party included Captain Archibald Butt, who served with the groom in the White House as a Presidential aide. The couple had three daughters:
Thalia Fortescue (1911–1963), who married Thomas Hedges Massie (1905–1987), a Navy lieutenant.
Kenyon Fortescue (1914–1990), an actress whose stage-name was Helene Whitney; she married J. Louis Reynolds in 1936.
Marion Fortescue, who married Daulton Gillespie Viskniskki in 1934

The couple's eldest daughter, Thalia Massie, was allegedly raped in 1932, and this embroiled her mother, Grace Fortescue, in a case of murder. The trial for murder, conducted in Hawaii in 1932, came to be known as the "Massie Affair". Afterwards, Grace returned to a quiet life with her husband as they moved seasonally between family homes on Long Island and in Palm Beach.

Fortescue died on April 21, 1952 and was laid to rest in Arlington National Cemetery, the only Roosevelt to be buried there.

Family tree

Published works
His journalism experience led to further writing:
 1914 – At the Front with Three Allies: My Adventures in the Great War. London: A. Melrose, Ltd.
 1915 –  Russia, the Balkans and the Dardanelles. London: A. Melrose, Ltd. OCLC: 1562062
 1915 – What of the Dardanelles?  An Analysis. London: Hodder and Stoughton. OCLC: 2736904
 1916 –   Fore-armed: How to Build a Citizen Army. Philadelphia: John C. Winston Co.  OCLC: 406647
 1917 –  France Bears the Burden. New York: Macmillan. OCLC: 1183757
 1937 – Front Line and Deadline: The Experiences of a War Correspondent. New York: G. P. Putnam's Sons.  OCLC: 987696

See also
 Military attachés and observers in the Russo-Japanese War

Notes

References
 Spinzia, Raymond E. and Judith A. Spinzia. (2006). Long Island's Prominent North Shore Families: Their Estates And Their Country Homes. College Station, Texas:  Virtualbookworm. ;    OCLC: 74029682
 Stannard, David. "The Massie case: Injustice and courage," The Honolulu Advertiser. October 14, 2001.

External links
 1905 Biographical Sketch
 PBS American Experience: "The Massie Affair".
 

1875 births
1952 deaths
People from Manhattan
American people of Dutch descent
Roosevelt family
Schuyler family
Recipients of the Distinguished Service Cross (United States)
Burials at Arlington National Cemetery
United States Army War College alumni
People of the Russo-Japanese War
Recipients of the Order of the Rising Sun
American war correspondents
United States military attachés
Yale College alumni
University of Pennsylvania alumni
United States Army personnel of World War I